Silver Tree may refer to:

 Silver Tree, film producer
 Silver Tree Day Camp, a San Francisco Recreation & Parks Department Summer day camp
 Silver Tree fountain, a famous construction of the Mongol Empire
 The Silver Tree, an album by Lisa Gerrard

Trees 
 Silver fir (disambiguation), a common name for several trees
 Silver pine (disambiguation), a common name for several trees
 Leucadendron argenteum, a species of tree from South Africa

Fiction
 Celeborn, a character in Tolkien's The Lord of the Rings whose name means "silver tree"
 Silver-Tree, a character in Gold-Tree and Silver-Tree, a Scottish fairy tale
 Telperion, or the Silver Tree, one of the Two Trees of Valinor in J.R.R. Tolkien's fictional universe